Gamani is a 2011 Sri Lankan Sinhala war thriller biographical film directed by Rear Admiral Sarath Weerasekara and produced by Upali Rajapakse. It stars Dilhani Ekanayake and Bimal Jayakody in lead roles along with Mahendra Perera and Jagath Chamila. Music composed by Nadeeka Guruge. It is the 1245th film in Sri Lankan cinema.

The film is influenced by 1999 LTTE terrorist attack of Gonagala massacre. The film has been shot in and around Karuwalagaswewa for 12 consecutive days.

Cast
 Dilhani Ekanayake as Sulochana Weerasekera 'Iskola Hamine'
 Bimal Jayakody as Major Vikum
 Mahendra Perera as Mahendra
 Jagath Chamila as Sunimal
 W. Jayasiri as Sumedha 'Hamuduruwo'
 Ranjith Rubasinghe as Sirisoma
 Jagath Benaragama as Jagath
 Suminda Sirisena as School teacher
 Kumara Thirimadura as Sergeant Ranasinghe
 Darshan Dharmaraj as LTTE leader
 Sampath Jayaweera as Upul
 Muthu Tharanga as Mala
 Asela Jayakody as Head Grama Arakshaka
 Sarath Kothalawala Ranasinghe's head officer
 Sanath Gunathilake as Army Chief
 Ritigala as himself
 Damitha Abeyratne as Crouched shooter
 Veena Jayakody as Dead rebel's mother
 Giriraj Kaushalya as NGO officer
 Geetha Kanthi Jayakody as Sudha's mother
 Rathna Lalani Jayakody as Murder victim
 Gihan Fernando as Minister's secretary
 Sujani Menaka as Upul's lover
 Manel Wanaguru as NGO Committee member
 Jayani Senanayake as Head Grama Arakshaka's wife
 Sarath Chandrasiri as LTTE cadre

Soundtrack

Awards
The film won 12 awards at 2011 Derana Film Awards Ceremony, including many major categories.

 Best Actress - Dilhani Ekanayake
 Best Film - Gamani
 Best Villain - Darshan Dharmaraj
 Best Music Director - Nadeeka Guruge
 Best Editing - Ravindra Guruge
 Best Stunt Direction - Priyantha Sirikumara (Ritigala Sumedha)
 Best Script - Rear Admiral Sarath Weerasekara
 Best Direction - Rear Admiral Sarath Weerasekara
 Best Co-actor - W. Jayasiri and Kumara Thirimadura
 Best Co-actress - Muthu Tharanga
 Best Cinematography - Ashoka Sigera
 Best Background Artist - Deepika Priyadarshani

References

2011 films
2010s Sinhala-language films